Karna is a 1986 Indian Kannada-language film, directed by H. R. Bhargava and produced by B. Anuradha Singh, R. Dushyanth Singh and R. Amritha Singh. The film stars Vishnuvardhan, Sumalatha, K. S. Ashwath and Sumithra. The film has musical score by M. Ranga Rao. The film was a remake of the 1981 Bengali film Saaheb which was earlier remade in Hindi as Saaheb.

Cast

Vishnuvardhan as Karna
Sumalatha
Sumithra
K. S. Ashwath
Gangadhar
Shivaram
Lakshman
Saikumar
Jayakumar
Rajanand
Chethan Ramarao
Thimmayya
Bharathkumar
Shivaprakash
Suryakumar
Phani Ramachandra
Swagath Jayaram
A. S. Balu
Kittu
Murali
Samyuktha
Prashanthi
Kokila
K. N. Bharathi
Sathyabhama
B. Jayashree
Baby Rashma Bhargav
Kumari Seetha
Master Sathish
Master Ganesh
Rajesh in Special Appearance
Sangram Singh in Special Appearance
Thoogudeepa Srinivas in Special Appearance

Soundtrack
Music was composed by M. Rangarao. The song "Pyaar Bina Chhen" from the original Hindi film has been reused as "Preethiya Nannusiru".
"Tharam Pam" - SPB, S. Janaki
"Chuku Chuku Bidi" - S. Janaki
"Aahaa Nanna" - SPB
"Aa Karnananthe" - K. J. Yesudas
"Preethiye" - SPB, S. Janaki

References

External links
 
 

1986 films
1980s Kannada-language films
Films scored by M. Ranga Rao
Kannada remakes of Bengali films
Films directed by H. R. Bhargava